Mistress of Mellyn was the first Gothic romance novel written by Eleanor Hibbert under the pen name Victoria Holt.

Plot 
A young woman, Martha Leigh, is hired as a governess by Connan TreMellyn, a widower, for his daughter, Alvean. Martha travels to Cornwall and becomes fascinated by her employer and his dead wife. While struggling with her increasingly romantic feeling towards Connan TreMellyn, Martha also tries to solve the mystery of his wife's death in the haunted mansion while trying to avoid death herself.

Characters 
 Martha Leigh: the 24-year-old governess to Alvean TreMellyn
 Connan TreMellyn: widower and landowner in Cornwall
 Alice TreMellyn: Connan TreMellyn's dead wife
 Alvean TreMellyn: Connan TreMellyn's daughter
 Celestine Nansellock: Connan TreMellyn's friend
 Peter Nansellock: Connan TreMellyn's friend, Celestine's brother
 Geoffry Nansellock: Connan TreMellyn's dead friend, Celestine and Peter's brother
 Miss Jansen: former governess to Alvean TreMellyn
 Lady Linda Treslyn: Connan TreMellyn's lover
 Sir Thomas Treslyn: Linda's husband
 Joe Tapperty: servant
 Mrs. Tapperty: servant, Joe's wife
 Daisy: servant, Joe and Mrs. Tapperty's daughter
 Kitty: servant, Joe and Mrs. Tapperty's daughter
 Mrs. Polgrey: housekeeper at Mount Mellyn
 Tom Polgrey: servant, Mrs. Polgrey's husband
 Jennifer Polgrey: Tom and Mrs. Polgrey's dead daughter
 Gilly/Gillyflower: Jennifer's shy daughter
 Billy Trehay: servant
 Aunt Adelaide: Martha's aunt
 Phillida Leigh: Martha's sister

Themes

Gothic
Set in 19th century England, Mistress of Mellyn weaves together elements from earlier Gothic novels such as Jane Eyre (1847), The Woman in White (1859), and Rebecca (1938) - a young, impressionable girl meets a mysterious widower in a mansion filled with the memories of his first wife who has suffered a tragic death.

Romantic suspense
The romance between the young governess and her handsome employer is hampered by the mystery surrounding the tragic death of his first wife. Looking to solve the mystery, the young woman starts poking around the gloomy corners of the spooky mansion set on the wild Cornish cliffs.

Publication

1960 edition 
The novel was published by Doubleday in the United States and Collins in the United Kingdom.

Later Editions 
The novel was serialized in the Ladies' Home Journal, chosen as a Reader's Digest condensed book and issued in a treasury volume that included other Gothic authors such as Daphne du Maurier, Phyllis A. Whitney, Evelyn Anthony, Madeleine Brent and Jessica Nelson North.

Several reprints were issued over the years. It was issued in ebook format by St. Martin's Griffin, New York in 2009 and St. Martin's Press, New York in 2013.

Location
The novel's setting in Cornwall made the resemblance to Rebecca so remarkable that it was speculated that Victoria Holt was a pseudonym for Daphne du Maurier. After six Victoria Holt novels were published over eight years, it was revealed that Hibbert was the author.

Reception 
Most early reviews were positive. A critic found "the dramatic tale compounded of mystery and romance, and full of surprises for even the most wary reader." Another critic said it was "a novel to delight the most romantic reader." Mistress of Mellyn became an instant international bestseller and revived the Gothic romantic suspense genre. The book earned Hibbert £100,000.

Adaptations 
In 1961, Mildred C. Kuner adapted the novel into a play in three acts. Paramount purchased the film rights to the novel, but never produced a film.

The novel was adapted into the 1965 Taiwanese film .

References

External links 
 Victoria Holt books on fan site
 Victoria Holt novels by publisher Macmillan

1960 British novels
British Gothic novels
Novels set in Cornwall
Works published under a pseudonym
Novels set in the 19th century
William Collins, Sons books